Topuchaya (Topuçiy) is a rural locality (a selo) in Dyektiyekskoye Rural Settlement of Shebalinsky District, the Altai Republic, Russia. The population was 194 as of 2016. There are 2 streets.

Geography 
Topuchaya is located 21 km south of Shebalino (the district's administrative centre) by road. Kumalyr is the nearest rural locality.

References 

Rural localities in Shebalinsky District